Distillate fuel, also called tractor fuel, was a petroleum product that was commonly used to power North American agricultural tractors in the early and mid-twentieth century. The product was crudely refined, akin to kerosene chemically, but impure.

Characteristics
North American distillate is broadly described as a fuel with heavier molecular weight than gasoline, and similar to or lighter than kerosene or No. 1 fuel oil. However, both usage of the term and formulation of the product varied widely. Octane ratings varied similarly, between 33 and 45.

Usage
Early railroad motor cars and tractors were offered with kerosene or gasoline-powered engines. Beginning in 1925, distillate-powered versions were offered, persisting until 1956, when the last "all-fuel" tractors were sold, while diesel-fueled tractors increased in popularity. Kerosene-engined tractors were phased out by 1934. Distillate fuel was used in machines with specific provisions for distillate, as well as all-fuel tractors which could handle kerosene, gasoline or distillate. Tractors designed for distillate could operate on gasoline, and were usually started with gasoline, but since they operated at a much lower compression ratio than gasoline-engined models, they developed less power on gasoline and had to be warmed up before they could switch to distillate. Compression ratios for distillate could be about 4.7:1, while gasoline engines would run at 7:1 or more. Such machines were provided with small gasoline tanks for starting and warming up. However, distillate was often substantially less expensive than gasoline in farming regions, either because it was a less-refined product or because it was taxed at a lower rate or untaxed. "Power fuel" was a higher grade product that was somewhat short of gasoline in effectiveness.

Distillate fuel oil
Distillate was withdrawn from the market as cheaper and higher-grade gasoline and diesel fuels reached the markets. In time, "distillate" came to describe lighter fractions of diesel and fuel oil, with "No. 1 distillate" and "No. 2 distillate" referring to the lighter fractions of both products, albeit with different characteristics between fuel oil and diesel fuel.

See also
 Tractor vaporising oil, a similar, but higher-quality product used from the late 1930s until 1974 in the United Kingdom and Australia

References

Petroleum products
Tractors
Fuels
Internal combustion piston engines